Markus Sebastianus Meijer (born September 1970) is a Dutch real estate investor, the chief executive officer (CEO) of MARK Capital Management, a London-based privately held real estate investment company, specialising in urban mixed-use property.

Markus Sebastianus Meijer was born in September 1970, the son of fellow property developer Ton Meijer. Meijer received a master's degree in law from Leyden University in 1995, and an MBA from INSEAD in 2002.

In 2005, Meijer and his father co-founded MARK Capital Management.

In 2010, Meijer and his US partner Joseph Sitt bought London's Burlington Arcade for £104 million.

References

1970 births
Living people
Dutch chief executives in the finance industry
Dutch chief executives in the retail industry
INSEAD alumni